Pauline Goldsmith is an actress, comedian and writer from Belfast, Northern Ireland.

Career
Goldsmith's first completed work is a one-woman Irish wake play titled Bright Colours Only. It was first performed in November 2001. It was for two years at the Edinburgh Fringe Festival, and also in productions in England (2002) and in Brazil (2003).

Goldsmith won the 2004 Best Actress Award at the Edinburgh Festival Fringe for her performance in Samuel Beckett's 1972 play Not I. She also performed her second play, Should've Had the Fish, at the Assembly Rooms at the Fringe Festival during August 2006.

Film credits
Goldsmith has appeared in the following films:
How High the Castle Walls (1997; short film) 
The Magdalene Sisters (2002) 
16 Years of Alcohol (2003) 
Hikkimori (2007)
Peacefire (2008)

Awards
Best Actress, Edinburgh Festival Fringe (2004)
Creative Scotland (2006)

See also

 List of British playwrights
 List of people from Belfast

References

Living people
Year of birth missing (living people)
Place of birth missing (living people)
20th-century births
20th-century actresses from Northern Ireland
20th-century British dramatists and playwrights
21st-century actresses from Northern Ireland
21st-century British dramatists and playwrights
Women dramatists and playwrights from Northern Ireland
Women comedians from Northern Ireland
Film actresses from Northern Ireland
Actresses from Belfast
Stage actresses from Northern Ireland
21st-century women writers from Northern Ireland
21st-century British women writers
Comedians from Belfast